María Gloria Bobadilla Granada is a Paraguayan lawyer. She is president of the Paraguayan Association of Female Lawyers (ADAP).

Career
In 1993 María Gloria Bobadilla brought a case before the Paraguayan Civil Court on behalf of a Paraguayan living in Italy, Ramón Fidel, who had undergone gender reassignment surgery and wanted to be officially registered as a woman and not as a man. Fidel died in a traffic accident before the case could be decided. In 2008, Bobadilla called for the law to be clarified:

In 2015 Bobadilla called for the consideration of new measures, including ankle monitors and chemical castration, to combat rape and other sexual crimes in Paraguay.

Bobadilla was elected ADAP (Asociación de Abogadas Paraguayas) president in April 2019. In 2020 she objected to new plans announced by the Supreme Court of Justice governing the re-registration of lawyers, arguing that re-registration should be free. In July 2021 ADAP publicly rebuked Roberto Gonsález, a deputy and former president of the Council of Magistrates, for having referred to critics of the National Republican Association as "whores with scapulars". Bobadilla criticized the misogynist violence of González's language:

References

Year of birth missing (living people)
Living people
21st-century Paraguayan lawyers
Paraguayan women lawyers
20th-century Paraguayan lawyers